Josiah Maduabuchi (born 16 April 1988 in Lagos) is a Nigerian football player currently with Lobi Stars F.C.

Career 
Maduabuchi began his career with Wikki Tourists F.C. and joined 2007 to Enyimba International F.C.
He joined Lobi Stars in 2015

Position
He plays as a versatile central attacking midfielder.

International career
On 15 April 2010 he earned his first call-up for the Super Eagles and was part of the Training Camp for the 2010 FIFA World Cup in South Africa.

References

1987 births
Living people
Nigerian footballers
Nigeria international footballers
Wikki Tourists F.C. players
Association football midfielders
Enyimba F.C. players